Douglas do Espírito Santos Torres (born 30 March 2002), commonly known as Douglas Borel, is a Brazilian professional footballer who plays as a right-back for Bahia.

Career statistics

Honours
Bahia
Campeonato Baiano: 2019
Copa do Nordeste: 2021

References

2002 births
Living people
Brazilian footballers
People from Camaçari
Association football defenders
Campeonato Brasileiro Série A players
Campeonato Brasileiro Série B players
Esporte Clube Bahia players
Sportspeople from Bahia